Yiorgo Moutsiaras (born 1976) is a Greek orchestral conductor living in Delft since October 2005. He is conducting the Filharmonisch Orkest ’s-Hertogenbosch -an orchestra in 's-Hertogenbosch, the Netherlands.

Life 
Moutsiaras was born in Volos, Greece as son of Kostas Moutsiaras and Virginia Barouta-
Moutsiara. He visited schools in Greece successfully and studied piano and theory of music from 1983 until 1999. During serving his military service in the Greek Air Force he was a member of the 114th's and 111th Combat Wing's military orchestras.

Diplomas
 Academy for Music and Dance of Rotterdam (CODARTS) in March 2003, orchestral conducting
 Conservatory of Maastricht (Hogeschool Zuyd) in June 2004, orchestral conducting
 Lemmens Institute (Hogeschool voor Wetenschap en Kunst) in Leuven in September 2006 in orchestral conducting
 1st Detmold Summer Academy’s classes in September 2004, with Kurt Masur

Works 
Yiorgo Moutsiaras is rumored to be currently in a project of rearranging, exclusive for classic orchestra, Greek traditional music (rembetika) like Tsitsanis, since 2009.

Discography

References

External links 
 Website
 Filharmonisch Orkest 's-Hertogenbosch website

1976 births
Living people
Dutch conductors (music)
Male conductors (music)
Greek conductors (music)
Greek emigrants to the Netherlands
Musicians from Volos
21st-century conductors (music)
21st-century male musicians